National symbols of Trinidad and Tobago are the symbols that are used in Trinidad and Tobago and abroad to represent the country and its people.

Prominently, the Coat of Arms of Trinidad and Tobago is a Trinbagonian symbol, and is depicted on all its money.

Present Symbols

Former List of symbols

References

 
National emblems